Fox v. Vice, 563 U.S. 826 (2011), was a United States Supreme Court case in which the Court held that reasonable fees may be granted to the defendant in a suit that involves both frivolous and non-frivolous claims, but only for costs resulting from the frivolous claims.

Notes

See also 
 List of United States Supreme Court cases, volume 563

References

External links
 

2011 in United States case law
United States Supreme Court cases
United States Supreme Court cases of the Roberts Court